William Nickle may refer to:

 William Folger Nickle (1869–1957), Canadian politician, member of the Canadian House of Commons and in the Ontario legislature
 William McAdam Nickle (1897–?), Ontario political figure

See also
William Nicol (disambiguation)
William Nichol (disambiguation)